The 2020 Belarusian Super Cup was held on 4 March 2020 between the 2019 Belarusian Premier League champions Dinamo Brest and the 2018–19 Belarusian Cup winners Shakhtyor Soligorsk. Dinamo Brest won the match 2–0 and won the trophy for the third time.

Match details

See also
2019 Belarusian Premier League
2018–19 Belarusian Cup

References

Belarusian Super Cup
Super
Belarusian Super Cup
Sports competitions in Minsk
2020s in Minsk
FC Shakhtyor Soligorsk matches